Lam Dal or Laam Dal is a high altitude lake located in Piura Dhar of Chamba district in Himachal Pradesh, India.

History 
Lama Dal lake is held sacred to Lord Shiva. It is part of holy pilgrimage that is held in July/August based on Hindu calendar. Kareri Lake is situated just 3 km (air distance) south west. This lake is a moderate/advance trekking destination accessible via Ghera (road accessible) - Kareri - Kareri Lake and also via Mcleod Gung (road accessible) - Truid - Bagga trail.

References

External links
Himachal Pradesh Tourism Department

Lakes of Himachal Pradesh
Geography of Chamba district